John "Jack" Lally was an English professional rugby league footballer who played in the 1900s and 1910s. He played at representative level for England, and at club level for Widnes.

International honours
Jack Lally won caps for England while at Widnes in 1909 against Australia (2 matches), and was Widnes' first England representative.

References

External links
Statistics at rugby.widnes.tv

England national rugby league team players
English rugby league players
Place of birth missing
Place of death missing
Widnes Vikings players
Year of birth missing
Year of death missing